Drážov is a municipality and village in Strakonice District in the South Bohemian Region of the Czech Republic. It has about 200 inhabitants.

Administrative parts
Villages of Dobrš, Kváskovice and Zálesí are administrative parts of Drážov.

References

Villages in Strakonice District